Macho is an album by Hungarian guitarist Gábor Szabó featuring performances recorded in 1975 and released on the Salvation label.

Reception
The Allmusic review states "This is a tough, streetwise, commercial jazz album that has plenty to offer to anyone with an open mind. In the pocket, groove-soaked, and flawlessly executed".

Track listing
All compositions by Gábor Szabó except as indicated
 "Hungarian Rhapsody No. 2" (Franz Liszt) - 6:56 
 "Time" - 5:41 
 "Transylvania Boogie" (Bob James) - 5:37 
 "Ziggidy Zog" (Harvey Mason) - 6:03 
 "Macho" - 9:16 
 "Poetry Man" (Phoebe Snow) - 4:32 
 "Evening in the Country" - 5:24 Bonus track on CD reissue   
 "Macho" [alternate take] - 11:27 Bonus track on CD reissue  
Recorded at Kendun Recorders in Burbank, California on April 3, 4, 5, 7 & 8, 1975

Personnel
Gábor Szabó, Eric Gale - guitar
Bob James - keyboards, arranger, conductor
Ian Underwood - synthesizer
Tom Scott - tenor saxophone, lyricon
John Faddis - trumpet 
George Bohanon - trombone 
Scott Edwards, Louis Johnson - bass 
Harvey Mason - drums, arranger
Bobbye Hall, Idris Muhammad, Ralph MacDonald - percussion

References

CTI Records albums
Gábor Szabó albums
1975 albums
Albums produced by Bob James (musician)